Crisa may refer to:

Crissa, a town of ancient Phocis, Greece
CRISA, a Spanish aerospace company
Erno Crisa (1924-1968), Italian actor